Evelyn Francis Edward Seymour, 17th Duke of Somerset  (1 May 1882 – 26 April 1954) was a British Army officer, landowner, peer, and for eight years Lord Lieutenant of Wiltshire. He was also a baronet. Between 1 May 1882 and 5 May 1931, he was styled as Lord Seymour.

Early life
The son of Edward Seymour, 16th Duke of Somerset, by his marriage to Rowena Wall, Seymour was born in Colombo, Ceylon. His maternal grandfather, George Wall, was a coffee merchant and botanist. He was educated at Blundell's School, Tiverton, and later at the Royal Military College, Sandhurst. He was gazetted a second lieutenant on the Unattached List in January 1901, before being attached to the Royal Dublin Fusiliers.

Military career
Seymour served throughout the Second Boer War (1901–02) and received the Queen's South Africa Medal with five clasps. He took part in the operations in the Aden Protectorate in 1903.

In April 1913, Seymour, then of the Royal Dublin Fusiliers, was appointed adjutant of the 25th (County of London) Cyclist Battalion of the London Regiment, in which posting he continued until 1916, before returning to the Royal Dublin Fusiliers to take command of its 10th Battalion. In December 1917, he was promoted Acting Lieutenant Colonel. In 1918, he was awarded the DSO and in 1919 he served in the Adjutant-General's department of the War Office. He was appointed OBE in 1919 and retired from the service in 1920. He succeeded to his father's dukedom in 1931.

During the Second World War, Somerset returned to the army. With effect from 1 November 1939, he was appointed a Lieutenant Colonel of the Devonshire Regiment, in which he commanded a battalion, and he later held an appointment as a full Colonel on the General Staff.

Civilian life
Somerset was a member of The Magic Circle for many years, having first joined it in 1907, after becoming a pupil of the magician Ernest Noakes. He became the organization's president in 1935, after the death of Lord Ampthill.

On 12 May 1937, he bore the Sceptre with the Cross at the coronation of King George VI.

On his retirement from active service with the Army, Somerset returned to Maiden Bradley to take charge of his estates in Wiltshire and Somerset.

On 4 May 1942 he was appointed Lord Lieutenant of Wiltshire, succeeding Sir Ernest Wills.

On 19 March 1949, "having exceeded the age limit", he relinquished his commission as an honorary Colonel of the Devon Regiment on retired pay.

In 1950, he was appointed a knight of the Venerable Order of Saint John.

He was a member of the Army and Navy Club, the Naval & Military Club, and the Marylebone Cricket Club.

Succession
In London on 3 January 1906, he married Edith Mary Parker (d. Maiden Bradley, Wiltshire, 19 April 1962), daughter of William Parker, of Whittington Hall, Derbyshire, England, and Lucinda Steeves, daughter of William Steeves. Evelyn and Edith had four children: 
The Hon. Francis William Seymour (28 December 1906 – 14 May 1907)
The Hon. Algernon Francis Edward Seymour (22 July 1908 – 14 February 1911)
Percy Hamilton Seymour, 18th Duke of Somerset (27 September 1910 – 15 November 1984)
Lady Susan Mary Seymour (Crowborough, Sussex, 26 April 1913 – 23 May 2004), unmarried and without issue.

The Duke died in London on 26 April 1954.

Ancestry

References

Obituary of the Duke of Somerset, Lord Lieutenant of Wiltshire, in The Times, 27 April 1954 (pg. 10; Issue 52916; col E)

External links 

1882 births
1954 deaths
People educated at Blundell's School
Companions of the Distinguished Service Order
Devonshire Regiment officers
British Army personnel of the Second Boer War
British Army personnel of World War I
British Army personnel of World War II
Graduates of the Royal Military College, Sandhurst
517
Lord-Lieutenants of Wiltshire
Officers of the Order of the British Empire
Royal Dublin Fusiliers officers
Wall family
Evelyn Seymour, 17th Duke of Somerset
Somerset County Cricket Club presidents
British landowners
British Army officers